Emma Väänänen (22 December 1907 – 20 February 1970) was a Finnish film actress. She appeared in 49 films between 1941 and 1969. She was a member of the jury at the 1st Moscow International Film Festival in 1959.

Selected filmography
 Golden Light (1946)
 Tree Without Fruit (1947)
 People in the Summer Night (1948)
 The Harvest Month (1956)

References

External links

1907 births
1970 deaths
People from Mikkeli
People from Mikkeli Province (Grand Duchy of Finland)
Finnish film actresses
20th-century Finnish actresses